Necessary Evil is a 2008 American thriller film. It was directed by Peter J. Eaton, written by Eric Feldman and Christopher James Harvill, starring Frank Novak, Donald Agnelli and Lance Henriksen. The film is also known under the title Sabotage in the United States, and Species Evil in Japan.

Cast 
 Frank Novak as Army General
 Lance Henriksen as Dr. Fibian
 Donald Agnelli as Albert Fielding
 Greg Collins as Michael Russo
 Danny Trejo as Barro
 Drue Delio as Mental patient
 James DuMont as Officer #1
 Mark Casimir Dyniewicz Jr. as Interrogator #2
 Evan Elliot as Ronald Benjamin
 Eric Feldman as Russo
 Kathryn Fiore as Deborah
 Aaron Fors as Stephen Green
 Daniele Gaither as Gail

References

External links 
 
 

2008 films
2000s English-language films
2008 thriller films
American thriller films
2000s American films